Solna is a station in Solna Municipality in Stockholm for commuter trains and the Tvärbanan light rail. The lines J40 (Uppsala C-Södertälje C), J41 (Märsta-Södertälje C), J42 (Märsta-Nynäshamn) and L30 (Sickla-Solna station) stop here, as well as ten bus lines. The commuter train station opened in 1895, but was moved a 100 meters in 1903 and moved again in 1911, when the tunnel through the hill Hagalundsberget to the south was completed. In 1955 the name of the station was changed from "Hagalund" to "Solna". The northern entrance is located at a bridge connecting the Arenastaden and Frösunda areas of the Järva district. Arenastaden is home to the Friends Arena and the Westfield Mall of Scandinavia. The southern entrance is located between the districts Hagalund and Råsunda. In 2014 the Tvärbanan line was extended to the south entrance, with a stop called Solna station. A metro station, named "Arenastaden", on a new extension from Odenplan, is planned to have its southern entrance next to the Tvärbanan station, on the other side from the railway station entrance, while the northern exit will be just south of the Arenastaden area. On an average day, 20 900 journeys are done by commuter train from Solna station, 5 200 by Tvärbanan and 4 600 by bus.

References

Solna Municipality
Railway stations in Stockholm County